Akinwande is a surname of Yoruba origin. Notable people with the surname include:

Akintunde Akinwande, Nigerian-American scientist and engineer
Deji Akinwande, Nigerian-American scientist and engineer
Hassanat Akinwande, Nigerian actress
Henry Akinwande (born 1965), English boxer

Yoruba-language surnames